Over My Shoulder is Mel Parsons' debut album, released on 9 March 2009 on Cape Road Recordings. Parsons returned to New Zealand to start work on her debut album in 2007. The album was written by Parsons, and recorded with co-producer Shaun Elley and her backing band The Rhythm Kings, along with support from Don McGlashan, The Sami Sisters, Lisa Tomlins, and Neil Watson.  Parsons created her own label, Cape Road Recordings, so she could release her album independently while using the New Zealand music firm Border Music for distribution. The album was nominated for the Tui NZ Music Award's Folk Album of the Year.

Track list

Personnel

Musicians
 Mel Parsons – vocals, guitar
 Shaun Elley – drums
 Aaron Stewart - double bass
 Ed Zuccollo - keys
 The Sami Sisters – vocal harmony
 Don McGlashan - euphonium 

Production
 Mel Parsons - producer
 David Long - producer
 Shaun Elley - producer
 Mike Gibson – mastering
 Richard Shirley - engineering

Chart
{| class="wikitable"
!align="left"|Chart
!align="left"|Peak position
|-
|align="left"|Top 20 IMNZ Albums
| style="text-align:center;"| 16
|-
|}

References

2009 debut albums
Mel Parsons albums